The Consortium of Lesbian Gay Bisexual and Transgender Voluntary and Community Organisations UK, known as the LGBT Consortium, is national specialist infrastructure and membership organisation. They focus on the development and support of LGBT groups, organisations and projects so they can better deliver direct services and campaign for LGBT rights.

Supporting the LGBT third sector

The LGBT Consortium has four key elements to it strategy in supporting its members which are LGBT organisations rather than individuals:

Support - provide advice, information and guidance

Share - develop networks and partnerships

Shout - represent and provide a voice for LGBT organisations and groups

Store - gather and collate information and research

Activity programme

Consultation on key issues with their members and giving feedback to policy makers and stakeholders which advocate their members’ concerns and issues - primarily around funding, capacity and local engagement.

Develop their members through training and guidance

Create resources to help their members grow their organisations

Promote the existence and value of LGBT groups and organisations

External links

 Consortium web page

LGBT organisations in the United Kingdom